Benna (alternatively spelled bennah, or called ditti) is a genre of Antiguan and Barbudan music.

Benna is a calypso-like genre, characterized by scandalous gossip and a call-and-response format. It first appeared after the prohibition of slavery, and became a form of folk communication in the early 20th century, and it spread local news across the islands. John Quarkoo was a singer who used the genre to criticize oppressors of black people. It was the main genre of non-religious music in the region until the 1950s, after which was replaced by the popularity of Trinidad calypso.

References 

Antigua and Barbuda music
Calypso music